The Senate (Sénat) is the upper house of the Parliament of Gabon. It has 102 members, elected for a six-year term in single-seat constituencies by local and départemental councillors. Beginning with the 2009 election, some constituencies elect two senators.

The 1991 Constitution provided for the establishment of the Senate; previously the legislature had consisted of a unicameral National Assembly. The Senate was not created until 1997, when an election was held to fill the seats in the upper house.

The first Senate president was Georges Rawiri (1932-2006), a long-time national political figure and close ally of Omar Bongo. He served in this position until his death in 2006.

He was replaced by René Radembino Coniquet, also a member of the Myéné ethnic group.

A Senate election was held on 18 January 2009. The ruling Gabonese Democratic Party won a large majority of seats. On this occasion, the number of senators was increased from 91 to 102. Following the election, Rose Francine Rogombé was elected as President of the Senate.

Elections

See also
 List of presidents of the Senate of Gabon

References

External links
Website of the Senate of Gabon

Gabon
Government of Gabon